Rodeo FX is a visual effects company involved in projects in the film, television and advertising industry. The company currently has studios in Montreal, Quebec City, Munich and Los Angeles.

History 
Rodeo FX was founded in 2006 in Montreal, Canada, by Sébastien Moreau and started producing visual effects for feature films in 2007. In 2013, the company started producing visual effects for television for the first time, creating over 150 visually altered shots for the fourth season of the HBO fantasy series Game of Thrones. In early 2014, it expanded outside of Montreal for the first time, opening an office in Quebec City, which now employs 35 animators and VFX-artists. In December 2014, following its acquisition of the VFX company Hatch FX, Rodeo FX opened an office in Los Angeles. According to Jordan Soles, Rodeo's vice president of technology and development, the step was taken to bring the company closer to the studios, directors and the film development process itself. In November 2017, the company announced the opening of a new office in Munich, Germany, to establish a hub for the visual effects market in Europe.

The studio's VFX work has been rewarded on many occasions, including six Visual Effects Society Award for visual effects; these included two for the television series Game of Thrones and four for motion pictures. The company has also received three Emmy Award for Outstanding Special Effects for its participation in the TV series Game of Thrones as well as three HPA (Hollywood Professional Association) Awards for the same series.

Filmography

Films

 2006: Lady in the Water
 2006: Eragon 2007: Nitro 2007: Continental, un film sans fusil 2007: The Golden Compass 2008: La ligne brisée 2008: It's Not Me, I Swear! (C'est pas moi, je le jure!) 2008: Death Race 2008: Journey to the Center of the Earth 2008: Indiana Jones and the Kingdom of the Crystal Skull 2008: The Day the Earth Stood Still 2009: Cadavres 2009: Mr. Nobody 2009: Journey to Mecca 2009: Amelia 2009: Terminator Salvation 2010: 10½ 2010: Incendies 2010: Repo Men 2010: Jonah Hex 2010: The Twilight Saga: Eclipse 2010: The Last Airbender 2010: Resident Evil: Afterlife 2010: Gulliver's Travels 2011: En terrains connus 2011: Le bonheur des autres 2011: Monsieur Lazhar 2011: Rango 2011: Source Code 2011: Immortals 2011: The Three Musketeers 2011: Mission: Impossible – Ghost Protocol 2012: Red Tails 2012: Underworld: Awakening 2012: Mirror Mirror 2012: Abraham Lincoln: Vampire Hunter 2012: The Amazing Spider-Man 2012: The Twilight Saga: Breaking Dawn – Part 2 2013: Jack the Giant Slayer 2013: The Host 2013: Percy Jackson: Sea of Monsters 2013: Pain & Gain 2013: Now You See Me 2013: On/Off 2013: Pacific Rim 2013: The Smurfs 2 2013: Jerusalem 2013: Enemy 2013: The Hunger Games: Catching Fire 2014: Beauty and the Beast 2014: Lucy 2014: Edge of Tomorrow 2014: Birdman 2014: Unbroken 2014: 22 Jump Street 2015: Jupiter Ascending 2015: Cinderella 2015: Furious 7 2015: Tomorrowland 2015: By the Sea 2015: Fantastic Four 2015: The Intern 2015: The Walk 2015: The Last Witch Hunter 2015: In the Heart of the Sea 2016: Deadpool 2016: Gods of Egypt 2016: The Divergent Series: Allegiant 2016: Two Lovers and a Bear 2016: Warcraft 2016: Central Intelligence 2016: The Legend of Tarzan 2016: Star Trek Beyond 2016: Nine Lives 2016: Arrival 2016: Wait Till Helen Comes 2016: Queen of Katwe 2016: The Promise 2016: Miss Peregrine's Home for Peculiar Children 2016: Fantastic Beasts and Where to Find Them 2016: Bad Santa 2 2016: Silence 2016: Assassin's Creed 2016: Resident Evil: The Final Chapter 2017: The Space Between Us 2017: Kong: Skull Island 2017: The Shack 2017: The Fate of the Furious 2017: Pirates of the Caribbean: Dead Men Tell No Tales 2017: Valérian and the City of a Thousand Planets 2017: The Gracefield Incident 2017: Downsizing 2017: It 2017: Home Again 2017: Blade Runner 2049 2017: Thor: Ragnarok 2017: Justice League 2017: Paddington 2 2017: Jumanji: Welcome to the Jungle 2017: Star Wars: The Last Jedi 2017: The Greatest Showman 2018: Black Panther 2018: Game Night 2018: A Wrinkle In Time 2018: Death Wish 2018: Paradox 2018: Sicario: Day of the Soldado 2018: Ant-Man and the Wasp 2018: Asura 2018: The Death and Life of John F. Donovan 2018: The House with a Clock in Its Walls 2018: Overlord 2018: The Nutcracker and the Four Realms 2018: Fantastic Beasts: The Crimes of Grindelwald 2018: Mowgli 2018: Aquaman 2018: Bumblebee 2019: The Kid Who Would Be King 2019: Dumbo 2019: Shazam! 2019: Pokémon Detective Pikachu 2019: Men in Black: International 2019: Godzilla: King of the Monsters 2019: Dark Phoenix 2019: Crawl 2019: It – Chapter Two 2019: Super Intelligence 2019: Anna 2019: Dhaka 2020: Bloodshot 2020: Magic Camp 2021: Chaos Walking 2021: Jungle Cruise 2021: Shang-Chi and the Legend of the Ten Rings 2022: Fantastic Beasts: The Secrets of Dumbledore 2022: RRR 2022: Slumberland 2022: Black Adam 2022: The Guardians of the Galaxy Holiday Special 2023: John Wick: Chapter 4Television
 2014: Game of Thrones – Season 4
 2015: Game of Thrones – Season 5
 2015: Fear the Walking Dead 2018: Krypton 2018: Tom Clancy's Jack Ryan 2019: Stranger Things – Season 3
 2019: The Boys 2019: Locke & Key 2019: Snowpiercer 2019: Watchmen 2019: Raising Dion 2020: Stranger Things - Season 4
 2021: WandaVision 2021: The Falcon and the Winter Soldier 2022: The Lord of the Rings: The Rings of Power''

Awards and nominations
The following list of awards and nominations for Rodeo FX lists accolades that have been presented to a team containing at least one employee of Rodeo FX.

External links

References 

Visual effects companies
Canadian animation studios
Mass media companies established in 2006